Denmark High School, located in Denmark, South Carolina, is significant as an example of Classical Revival educational architecture. The school, built in 1920, enlarged in 1932 and again in 1948, served the educational needs of the town from 1920–1985.  It was listed in the National Register of Historic Places on March 29, 2001.

References

School buildings on the National Register of Historic Places in South Carolina
Neoclassical architecture in South Carolina
1920 establishments in South Carolina
Buildings and structures in Bamberg County, South Carolina
High schools in South Carolina
Educational institutions established in 1920
Educational institutions disestablished in 1985
National Register of Historic Places in Bamberg County, South Carolina